Advanced Composite Materials is a bimonthly peer-review scientific journal that was established in 1991. It is published by Taylor & Francis on behalf of the Japan Society for Composite Materials and the Korean Society for Composite Materials. The journal covers all scientific and technological aspects of composite materials and composite material structures, including physical, chemical, mechanical, and other properties of advanced composites as well as microscopic to macroscopic behavior studied both experimentally and theoretically. Novel fabrication techniques for composites and composite structural components are also included.

In addition to original research papers, the journal publishes technical papers, review papers, and research notes. News accounts related to new materials and their processing are also included. Furthermore, some papers originally published in Japanese in the Journal of the Japan Society for Composite Materials are translated and published in this journal.

Abstracting and indexing 
The journal is abstracted and indexed by:

According to the Journal Citation Reports, the journal has a 2020 impact factor of 2.870.

References

External links 
 

Materials science journals
Publications established in 1991
Quarterly journals
English-language journals
Taylor & Francis academic journals
1991 establishments in Japan